The Águilas Cibaeñas (English lit. Cibaoan Eagles) is a professional baseball team in the Dominican Republic's winter baseball league. Founded on January 28,  and based in Santiago, the team has won 6 Caribbean Series and 22 national titles.

The team is popular among Dominican baseball fans by the phrase : “La Leña Está Aquí” (The Wood is here), and Águilas Cibaeñas has earned the nickname “Las Cuyayas” (The Kestrels) and “Los Mameyes” (The Mameyes). These nicknames are in reference to the team’s mascot and the classic yellow color the team uses in its official uniform.

  The Águilas Cibaeñas won the final game of the series at their home stadium Estadio Cibao (Stadium Cibao) by the score 2–1.  Mendy Lopez and Rafael Furcal both hit home runs in the game.  Furcal—popularly known as “Furcalazo”—sealed the game with his homerun in the 8th inning.

Estadio Cibao is nicknamed the “Valley of Death” and many fans consider it the most intimidating stadium for the other team in the country or even all the Caribbean. Estadio Cibao is known as the loudest and happiest stadium in the Caribbean. Historically the Águilas Cibaeñas have performed much better at home than on the road.

Águilas Cibaeñas have more former players in Major League Baseball than any other Dominican team.  Some current MLB players who played with Águilas Cibaeñas include Edwin Encarnación, Carlos Martínez, Jose Reyes, Jonathan Villar, Carlos Gómez, Juan Lagares, Dellin Betances, Bartolo Colón, Wandy Rodríguez, Melky Cabrera, Danny Santana, Yoenis Céspedes, Starling Marte, Brandon Moss and current Cleveland Guardians manager Terry Francona.

History
The meeting was attended by many notable Dominican athletes of the time including; Luis Alfáu, Pilindo Bonetti, Charles Dore, Manuel Henriquez, Burrulote Rodríguez, Julio and Miguel Peguero Linval, Luis Mercado, and Tomas Sainllant. The athletes recommended that the National Championship of 1937 should be held between a team from Santiago, a team from San Pedro de Macoris and a team from the Capital, Ciudad Trujillo. The team from the Capital was formed from two others, the Leones del Escogido and the Tigres del Licey, Trujillo himself named them the Dragones de Ciudad Trujillo.  The proposal was accepted and the team representing Santiago would be known from then on as the Águilas Cibaeñas. Since then, the club has become one of today's most competitive clubs in the history of Dominican professional baseball.

The development of the Águilas Cibaeñas as a team is linked to the development of baseball in the valley of Cibao. From 1951 to 1954, the championships were held during the summer months. However, before the start of season in 1955 the traditional professional baseball championship was moved to the winter season to allow the most prominent Dominican players an opportunity to play in it. Still to this day Dominican players employed by teams in the MLB take part of this national winter classic to keep the tradition strong.

Retired numbers

Current Roster 2017-18

References

External links
Official website

Santiago de los Caballeros
Baseball teams in the Dominican Republic
Baseball teams established in 1937
1937 establishments in the Dominican Republic